Anglo Petroleum v TFB (Mortgages) Ltd [2008] 1 BCLC 185 is a UK company law case concerning financial assistance.

Facts
A company in trouble, undergoing restructuring, undertook to pay back money after its acquisition. Repsol, the seller of shares, was only willing to sell if it received £15m. The company agreed to pay £15m to the parent, and the company’s shares were then sold for £1.

Judgment
The court held this was not financial assistance, because the agreed payment merely reduced the shares’ value to £1, rather than assisting in the purchase of the shares.

See also

UK company law

Notes

References

United Kingdom company case law
Court of Appeal (England and Wales) cases
2007 in British law
2007 in case law